Montes Apenninus are a rugged mountain range on the northern part of the Moon's near side. They are named after the Apennine Mountains in Italy. With their formation dating back about 3.9 billion years, Montes Apenninus are fairly old.

Description
This range forms the southeastern border of the large Mare Imbrium lunar mare and the northwestern border of the Terra Nivium highland region. It begins just to the west of the prominent crater Eratosthenes, which abuts against the southern face of the range. To the west of these mountains is a narrow gap where Mare Imbrium in the north joins Mare Insularum to the south. Further to the west are the Montes Carpatus mountains.

From Eratosthenes, the mountains form an arcing chain that gradually bends from east to northeast, ending at Promontorium Fresnel at about latitude 29.5° N. Here is another gap where the Mare Imbrium to the west joins the Mare Serenitatis to the east. At the north end of this gap lie the Montes Caucasus.

This range contains several mountains that have received names, listed below ranging from west to northeast:

 Mons Wolff
 Mons Serao (unofficial name)
 Mons Ampère
 Mons Huygens, often listed as the highest mountain on the Moon (though not the highest point)
 Mons Bradley
 Mons Hadley Delta
 Mons Hadley

The last two peaks are perhaps most famous for forming the valley where the Apollo 15 mission made its landing. This landing was considered one of the most scientifically successful missions of the Apollo program and started the last three J-Series missions that included the lunar rover and 3-day stays. Apollo 15 explored smaller peak Mons Hadley Delta (δ) and Rima Hadley rille. This was perhaps the most geologically diverse landing site of the program.

Much of this range forms a sharp, rugged rise at the edge of the Mare Imbrium, with a wide expanse of foothills on the far (southeastern) face. There are, however, some rugged foothills on the northwestern side along the section of the range to the southeast of Archimedes.

Views

References

External links
 

Apenninus, Montes